Karl Ivar Martinsen (8 December 1920 – 24 September 2018) was a Norwegian speed skater. He competed in the 1500 m event at the 1948 and 1952 Olympics and finished 16th and 8th, respectively. He won bronze medals at the 1952 world and 1953 European allround championships.

Martinsen died in Stange, Norway on 24 September 2018, aged 97.

References

External links
 

1920 births
2018 deaths
People from Løten
Norwegian male speed skaters
Olympic speed skaters of Norway
Speed skaters at the 1948 Winter Olympics
Speed skaters at the 1952 Winter Olympics
World Allround Speed Skating Championships medalists
Sportspeople from Innlandet